The music of French Polynesia came to the forefront of the world music scene in 1992, with the release of The Tahitian Choir's recordings of unaccompanied vocal Christian music called himene tārava, recorded by French musicologist Pascal Nabet-Meyer.  This form of singing is common in French Polynesia and the Cook Islands, and is distinguished by a unique drop in pitch at the end of the phrases, which is a characteristic formed by several different voices; it is also accompanied by steady grunting of staccato, nonsensical syllables.

See also

Tahitian Drumming

References
Linkels, Ad. "The Real Music of Paradise". 2000.  In Broughton, Simon and Ellingham, Mark  with McConnachie, James and Duane, Orla (Ed.), World Music, Vol. 2: Latin & North America, Caribbean, India, Asia and Pacific, pp 218–229. Rough Guides Ltd, Penguin Books.

External links
  Audio clips: Traditional music of French Polynesia. Musée d'ethnographie de Genève. Accessed November 25, 2010.

Polynesia